The 1910 U.S. Open was the sixteenth U.S. Open, held June 17–20 at Philadelphia Cricket Club in Chestnut Hill, Pennsylvania, a neighborhood of northwest Philadelphia. Alex Smith, the champion four years earlier,  prevailed in an 18-hole playoff over his younger brother Macdonald Smith and 18-year-old John McDermott to win his second U.S. Open.

On Friday, Alex Smith opened with a pair of 73's to take the 36-hole lead by two shots ahead of McDermott, Gilbert Nicholls, Fred McLeod, and Tom Anderson.

Smith carded a 79 in the third round on Saturday morning that left him two behind McDermott, who shot a 75 for 223. In the final round that afternoon, McDermott was the first to finish and posted another 75 and a 298 total. Macdonald Smith shot 71 that also placed him at 298. McLeod had a chance to also post 298 after driving the final hole, but his putt for a two stayed out and he finished a shot back. Alex Smith also drove the green at the last needing only a two-putt to win, but he missed from 18 inches (45 cm) and tied with McDermott and his brother. Alex was not fazed by the near-miss; in the Monday playoff, his 71 beat McDermott by four and Macdonald by six.

McDermott won the next two U.S. Opens; he was the first American-born winner and remains the youngest champion (19) through 2016. Four-time champion Willie Anderson played in his final U.S. Open and finished eleventh; he died four months later of epilepsy at age 31.

The course also hosted in 1907 and is the present-day St. Martin's course, now nine holes.

Past champions in the field 

Source:

Did not play: Laurie Auchterlonie (1902), Harry Vardon (1900), Willie Smith (1899).

Round summaries

First round
Friday, June 17, 1910 (morning)

Source:

Second round
Friday, June 17, 1910 (afternoon)

Source:

Third round
Saturday, June 18, 1910 (morning)

Source:

Final round
Saturday, June 18, 1910 (afternoon)

Source:

Playoff
Monday, June 20, 1910

Source:

References

External links
1910 U.S. Open
USGA Championship Database

U.S. Open (golf)
Golf in Pennsylvania
U.S. Open (golf)
U.S. Open (golf)
U.S. Open
U.S. Open (golf)